The first world record in the 4 x 400 metres for men (athletics) was recognized by the International Amateur Athletics Federation, now known as the International Association of Athletics Federations, in 1912.  The IAAF's first record in the event was for a mark set the year before the organization's formation.  The men's record has been almost exclusively set by American teams, with one exception by one Jamaican team.  To June 21, 2009, the IAAF has ratified 15 world records in the event.

Records 1912–present
The following table shows the world record progression in the men's 4 x 400 metre relay, as ratified by the IAAF. "y" denotes time for 4 x 440 yards (1609 m), ratified as a record for this event.

References

4x400
World record men